Chlumetia borbonica is a moth of the family Euteliidae. It is known from Réunion, where it is found in low and medium altitudes and Madagascar.

It has a wingspan of approx. 22 mm.

The larvae feed on Syzgium cumini and Eucalyptus robusta of the family Myrtaceae.

References

Moths described in 1992
Euteliinae
Moths of Africa